Michael Alphonso Watkins (born August 10, 1995) is an American professional basketball player for Hapoel Haifa in the Israeli Basketball Premier League. He played college basketball player for the Penn State Nittany Lions of the Big Ten Conference. A  power forward, Watkins was named to the Big Ten All-Defensive team in 2018.

High school career

He first attended Mathematics, Civics and Sciences Charter School in Philadelphia, Pennsylvania. During his junior year at MCSCS he reached the 2014 Pennsylvania Interscholastic Athletic Association tournament championship game, racking up 17 points, 17 rebounds, and 5 blocks in a runner-up finish to Lincoln Park. He averaged 11.0 points, 12.5 rebounds, and 5.0 blocks during a junior campaign in which he totaled 17 double-doubles. 

Watkins transferred to The Phelps School, an all-boys college preparatory school located in Malvern, Pennsylvania, in his senior year. Watkins averaged 14 points, 11 rebounds, and 6.5 blocks per game during his final high school season, and helped The Phelps School win a state championship.

Recruiting
Rated as a 4-star recruit and the 3rd-best recruit from Pennsylvania in the class of 2015 by ESPN.com, Watkins was ranked no. 89 in his class by ESPN. He signed with Penn State on November 13, 2014, as part of the best recruiting class in school history.

College career
Watkins redshirted his first year. His redshirt freshman season Watkins averaged just over 8 points per game playing in 33 games starting 24 of the games. He was twice named Big Ten Freshman of the Week, on December 19, 2016 and January 16, 2017. 

In his sophomore season, Watkins averaged 12.1 points, 8.9 rebounds, and 2.3 blocks per contest. He had a 22-point, 11 rebounds, and 7 block performance in a late loss to Wisconsin. Watkins was named to the All-Big Ten Defensive Team. 

Watkins played 27 games as a junior before suffering a season-ending leg injury against Michigan in February 2018. He averaged 7.8 points, 7.4 rebounds (9th in the Big Ten), and 1.5 blocks per game (8th). Watkins scored his 1,000th point against Central Connecticut State on December 23, 2019. On February 11, 2020, Watkins scored a season-high 19 points in an 88–76 win against Purdue. He was suspended for the final game of the season versus Northwestern for a violation of team rules, which was later revealed to be a DUI arrest. 

As a senior in 2019-20, Watkins averaged 9.7 points, 7.6 rebounds (10th in the Big Ten), and 2.2 blocked shots per game (3rd).

Professional career
On September 30, 2020, Watkins signed his first contract, with Cimarrones del Choco of the Baloncesto Profesional Colombiano.

In 2021-22, he was playing forward and center for Hapoel Haifa in the Israeli Basketball Premier League.

Career statistics

College

|-
| style="text-align:left;"| 2015–16
| style="text-align:left;"| Penn State
| style="text-align:center;" colspan="11"|  Redshirt
|-
| style="text-align:left;"| 2016–17
| style="text-align:left;"| Penn State
| 33 || 24 || 23.8 || .590 || – || .643 || 8.1 || .6 || .8 || 2.7 || 9.7
|-
| style="text-align:left;"| 2017–18
| style="text-align:left;"| Penn State
| 29 || 28 || 26.3 || .685 || .000 || .611 || 8.9 || .7 || 1.0 || 2.3 || 12.1
|-
| style="text-align:left;"| 2018–19
| style="text-align:left;"| Penn State
| 27 || 14 || 20.8 || .561 || – || .447 || 7.4 || .5 || .6 || 1.5 || 7.8
|-
| style="text-align:left;"| 2019–20
| style="text-align:left;"| Penn State
| 30 || 17 || 21.0 || .545 || .000 || .565 || 7.6 || .5 || .8 || 2.2 || 9.7
|- class="sortbottom"
| style="text-align:center;" colspan="2"| Career
| 119 || 83 || 23.0 || .597 || .000 || .573 || 8.0 || .6 || .8 || 2.2 || 9.8

Personal life
Watkins is the fourth-oldest among eight children of Alphonso Griffin and Rebecca Watkins.

Watkins suffered from depression and bipolar disorder and in June 2018 Watkins was hospitalized after having suicidal thoughts. Watkins was charged with disorderly conduct on October 1, 2017. According to State College police, Watkins punched a man in the face on September 29, 2017, after being confronted about cutting to the front of the line at McDonald's. Watkins was also charged with possession of marijuana paraphernalia in June 2017 and charged for smashing a window at Baby's Burgers and Shakes in Downtown State College in September 2016. Since these charges Watkins has apologized saying "Sorry I have brought negative attention to Penn State University..."

References

External links
Penn State Nittany Lions bio

1995 births
Living people
American men's basketball players
Basketball players from Philadelphia
Penn State Nittany Lions basketball players
Power forwards (basketball)
American expatriate basketball people in Colombia
American expatriate basketball people in Israel
Israeli Basketball Premier League players
Centers (basketball)